Sulfhydryl oxidase 1 is an enzyme that in humans is encoded by the QSOX1 gene.

This gene encodes a protein that contains domains of thioredoxin and ERV1, members of two long-standing gene families. The gene expression is induced as fibroblasts begin to exit the proliferative cycle and enter quiescence, suggesting that this gene plays an important role in growth regulation. Two transcript variants encoding two different isoforms have been found for this gene.

References

Further reading